The Gotha B types of the Gothaer Waggonfabrik were two-seat reconnaissance/trainer aircraft of the German Air Force in the First World War.

Development 
In 1914 Gotha developed a biplane with 120 hp inline engine, which received the factory designation LD.7 and was classified by Idflieg as Gotha B.I.

The B.II (factory designation LD.10) differed significantly from the B.I: The wings were larger, the fuselage shorter and a rotary engine was installed.  The B.II was similar to an earlier concept, the Gotha LD.1 two-seater, which was powered by a Gnôme rotary engine with 100 hp.

Operational history 
18 B.Is were delivered and used until 1915 for reconnaissance, then as a trainer aircraft. The B.II, of which 10 were built, was also used as a trainer aircraft.

Specifications

References

Bibliography 

 Günter Kroschel, Helmut Stützer: Die deutschen Militärflugzeuge 1910 – 1918. Lohse-Eissing, Wilhelmshaven 1977.
 Heinz Nowarra: Die Entwicklung der Flugzeuge 1914 – 1918. Lehmanns, München 1959.

Gotha aircraft